The Fujifilm X-A3 is a rangefinder-styled digital mirrorless camera announced by Fujifilm on August 25, 2016. Sales began on November 10, 2016.

Features
The Fujifilm X-A3 is the first X-mount camera with a 180° LCD screen with touch-focus & touch-shooting. It is aimed at the growing selfie market, with new face detection and eye detection autofocus modes, for sharper results when taking Self portraits.

The Fujifilm X-A3 sports a regular Bayer filter sensor array, as opposed to the X-Trans sensor that is typical among the X-mount camera system.

The camera was designed in such a way that it could be used one handed, so all of the most used settings are within reach when using the camera in selfie mode.

This camera is only sold as a kit with the XC 16mm-50mm F3.5-5.6 OIS II; the camera body has not been sold alone.

Key features
 24 Megapixels
 23.6 x 16.6mm CMOS sensor (APS-C)
 Touch screen
 11 types of film simulations
 Improved autofocus like as X-T10
 TTL 256-zone metering, Multi / Spot / Average
 Face detection
 Eye detection
 1080p HD video
 WiFi connectivity

References

External links

X-A3
Cameras introduced in 2016